Nikos Pias (born 7 April 1960) is a Greek former professional footballer who played as a midfielder.

Career
Pias started as an amateur at Apollon Kalythies in Rhodes and in 1978 he moved to Rodos, where he won 2 second division championships. In the summer of 1984 he transferred to AEK Athens, as he was considered a great talent for the time. His best moment at AEK when during the 1984–85 season he scored 3 goals in 4 consecutive matches, against OFI and Panathinaikos at home and Apollon Athens away. He then competed at Olympiacos Volos and Panachaiki, for 2 seasons each. His career ended abruptly at Panargiakos in November 1992 after a serious injury, nevertheless, he got to play against his former club, AEK in August 1992 for the cup making an assist.

Honours

Rodos
Beta Ethniki: 1977–78, 1980–81

References

1960 births
Living people
Greek footballers
Super League Greece players
Rodos F.C. players
AEK Athens F.C. players
Olympiacos Volos F.C. players
Panachaiki F.C. players
Panargiakos F.C. players
Association football midfielders
Sportspeople from Nafpaktos